Following is a list of units in the New Zealand Sea Cadet Corps. Each unit is led and managed by the Cadet Unit Commander, and their officers and staff. There are currently 16 Sea Cadet Corps units in New Zealand. The newest unit, TS Ahuriri, was formed in September 2020.

Former Training Ships

See also
 New Zealand Sea Cadet Corps
 New Zealand Cadet Forces

References

New Zealand Cadet Forces
Youth organisations based in New Zealand